German submarine U-385 was a Type VIIC U-boat of Nazi Germany's Kriegsmarine during World War II.

She carried out two patrols. She did not sink or damage any ships.

She was sunk by a British warship and an Australian aircraft in the Bay of Biscay on 11 August 1944.

Design
German Type VIIC submarines were preceded by the shorter Type VIIB submarines. U-385 had a displacement of  when at the surface and  while submerged. She had two shafts and two  propellers.

U-385 was fitted with five  torpedo tubes (four fitted at the bow and one at the stern), fourteen torpedoes, one  SK C/35 naval gun, 220 rounds, and two twin  C/30 anti-aircraft guns. The boat had a complement of between forty-four and sixty.

Service history
The submarine was laid down on 16 May 1941 at the Howaldtswerke yard at Kiel as yard number 16, launched on 8 July 1942 and commissioned on 29 August under the command of Kapitänleutnant Hans-Guido Valenter.

She served with the 5th U-boat Flotilla from 29 August 1942 and the 6th flotilla from 1 March 1944.

The boat was moved from Kiel to Marviken in March 1944.

First patrol
U-385s first patrol took her from Marviken to St. Nazaire, in occupied France via the gap between Iceland and the Faroe Islands.

Second patrol and loss
The boat left St. Nazaire on 9 August 1944. On the 11th, whilst still in the Bay of Biscay, she was sunk by depth charges dropped by an Australian Sunderland flying boat of No. 461 Squadron RAAF (captained by pilot officer Ivan Southall) and the British sloop  captained by Cdr. NW Duck.

One man died in the U-boat; there were 42 survivors.

References

Bibliography

External links

German Type VIIC submarines
U-boats commissioned in 1942
U-boats sunk in 1944
U-boats sunk by Australian aircraft
U-boats sunk by British warships
U-boats sunk by depth charges
1942 ships
Ships built in Kiel
World War II submarines of Germany
World War II shipwrecks in the Atlantic Ocean
Maritime incidents in August 1944